Special Occasion is the second studio album by American R&B singer Bobby V. It was released by Disturbing tha Peace and Def Jam Recordings on May 8, 2007, in the United States. The singer co-wrote over three quarters of the album, which also features songwriting and production from Tim & Bob, Rodney "Darkchild" Jerkins, Timbaland, Sean Garrett, Don Vito, Bryan-Michael Cox and Dre & Vidal. It also features guest appearances by Ludacris, Timbaland and Fabolous.

The album was set to be released on December 12, 2006, but was delayed until May 8, 2007. Special Occasions first official single was the Rodney Jerkins-produced track "Turn the Page". The ballad features Valentino singing about trust and taking risks in a relationship. Special Occasion debuted at number 3 on the US Billboard 200, selling about 92,000 copies in its first week, just over one-half of his previous album's first-week sales. It also peaked at the top of the Billboard Top R&B/Hip-Hop Albums. By mid-2009, the album had sold approximately 550,000 copies in the US.

Track listing
Information is based on the album's liner notes.

Notes
 denotes co-producer
Sample credits
“Only Human” contains a sample from “Sunny Came Home" as performed by Shawn Colvin. 
”Soon As I Get Home” originally performed by Babyface.

Personnel
Credits adapted from the album's liner notes.

Bobby V – Lead Vocals, Background Vocals, Vocal arranger
Darrell "Delite" Allamby – Recording Engineer, Music Programming, Other Instruments, Background Vocals, Audio Mixing 
Kori Anders – Recording Engineer, Audio Mixing Assistant 
Alex "A.J." Angol – Additional Guitars 
Marcella Araica – Recording Engineer, Audio Mixing 
Ben Arrindell – Audio Mixing 
Anesha Birchett – Background Vocals 
Leslie Braithwaite – Audio Mixing 
Lincoln “Link” Browder – Background Vocals 
Bryan–Michael Cox – Music Programming, Drums, Bass played by, Piano, Additional Keyboards 
Darkchild – Recording Engineer, Instruments 
Das – Vocal Producer
Kevin Davis – Audio Mixing 
Kendrick "Wyldcard" Dean – Strings, Additional Keyboards 
Vincent DiLorenzo – Recording Engineer, Audio Mixing 
Fabolous – Rap Vocals 
Emile Ghantous (of The Insomniax) – Recording Engineer, Vocal arranger 
Erik Nelson (of The Insomniax) – Recording Engineer, Vocal arranger
Andrew Haller – Recording Engineer, Audio Mixing Assistant 
Jean Marie Horvat – Audio Mixing 
Bill Jabr – Guitar
Jon Jon – Other Instruments 
Tim Kelley – Drums, Drum Machine, Percussion, Acoustic Guitar, Bass, Keyboards, Audio Mixing 
Ludacris – Rap Vocals 
Patrick Magee – Recording Engineer 
Joshua Monroy – Recording Engineer 
Paul Osborn – Recording Engineer 
Bob Robinson – Minimoog Percussion, Electric Guitar, Acoustic Guitar, Bass, Acoustic Piano, Keyboards 
Andros Rodriguez – Recording Engineer 
Dave Russell – Audio Mixing
Tim Stewart – Guitar 
Corey Stocker – Recording Engineer 
Sam Thomas – Recording Engineer, Audio Mixing 
Timbaland – Rap Vocals 
Justin Trawick – Audio Mixing Assistant 
Mike Tsarfati – Audio Mixing Assistant 
Jeff Villanueva – Recording Engineer, Audio Mixing

Charts

Weekly charts

Year-end charts

Release history

References

2007 albums
Albums produced by Tim & Bob
Albums produced by Bryan-Michael Cox
Albums produced by Dre & Vidal
Albums produced by Jerome "J-Roc" Harmon
Albums produced by Sean Garrett
Albums produced by Rodney Jerkins
Albums produced by Timbaland
Bobby V albums
Def Jam Recordings albums
Disturbing tha Peace albums